Antonio De Paulo "Tony" Buti (born 20 August 1961) is an Australian politician. He has been a Labor Party member of the Western Australian Legislative Assembly representing the seat of Armadale since 2 October 2010, when he was elected in a by-election.

Buti attended the University of Western Australia and later the Australian National University, where he studied law, receiving his LL.B in 1992. He completed his PhD, which dealt with guardianship law and the Stolen Generations, at Wolfson College, Oxford University in 2003. From 1997, Buti lectured at the School of Law in Murdoch University. He is the author of several books on the removal of Aboriginal children from their families, as well as sports law.
Another book he wrote was an overview of the Perth Mint Swindle in 2011.  He also wrote a biography of Sir Ronald Wilson.

He was also chairman of the Armadale Redevelopment Authority prior to the reformation of the Redevelopment Authorities into the Metropolitan Redevelopment Authority, and subsequently, DevelopmentWA.

In 2010, following Labor frontbencher Alannah MacTiernan's resignation from the state Parliament to contest the federal seat of Canning at the 2010 federal election, Buti was preselected as Labor's candidate for the by-election. He won the seat easily with 57.9% of the primary vote and a two-party-preferred vote of 70.6% versus the Christian Democratic Party (the governing Liberal Party did not run a candidate).

Following the 2021 Western Australian state election, Dr Buti was formally sworn in as Minister for Finance; Lands; Sport and Recreation; Citizenship and Multicultural Interests on 19 March 2021. On 14 December 2022, following a Cabinet reshuffle, Buti became Minister for Education, Minister for Aboriginal Affairs, and Minister for Citizenship and Multicultural Interests.

Bibliography
 
  (with David Thorpe, Chris Davies and Paul Jonson)
  (with David Thorpe, Chris Davies, Saul Fridman and Paul Jonson)
 
 
 
  (with Saul Fridman)

References

1961 births
Living people
Members of the Western Australian Legislative Assembly
University of Western Australia alumni
Australian National University alumni
Alumni of Wolfson College, Oxford
Academic staff of Murdoch University
Academic staff of the University of Western Australia
Australian Labor Party members of the Parliament of Western Australia
People from Collie, Western Australia
Writers from Perth, Western Australia
21st-century Australian politicians
Australian politicians of Italian descent
Australian people of Calabrian descent
Australian expatriates in England